"Colors (Melody and Harmony) / Shelter" (stylised as "COLORS ~Melody and Harmony~ / Shelter") is a special release single by South Korean boyband Tohoshinki members Jejung and Yuchun in Japan. It was released on September 30, 2009. The song was a commemorative song for the 35th anniversary of Hello Kitty in Japan.

The songs were written and co-arranged by Jejung and Yuchun personally. Bandmate Junsu also worked on the arrangement of "Shelter." "Colors (Melody and Harmony)" featured on a special digital EP, Tohoshinki Special Package, released a week before the single's physical release. Also featured on the EP was Tohoshinki's song "Amaku Hateshinaku" and "Been So Long".

Track listing

CD+DVD version

CD only version

Charts

References 

2009 singles
Oricon Weekly number-one singles
Billboard Japan Hot 100 number-one singles
Japanese-language songs